Camponotus americanus is a species of carpenter ant. Despite normally nesting in soil, it is known that the species may nest under stones, under litter, or in rotten logs.

References

External links

americanus
Insects described in 1862